Anthony Francis "Anton" Furst (6 May 1944 – 24 November 1991) was an English production designer who won an Academy Award for overseeing design of Gotham City and the iconic Batmobile in Tim Burton's Batman (1989).

Life and career
Furst was born in London, England and trained at the Royal College of Art, London.

He designed two award-winning television films, Just One Kid and It's a Lovely Day Tomorrow, for director/producer John Goldschmidt. Furst also dabbled as a special effects technician on movies such as Alien. Paul Mayersberg introduced him to a young artist named Nigel Phelps, whom Furst quickly hired after seeing his portfolio. Phelps would become Furst's primary draftsman that he would verbally dictate to, after the initial drawing was completed Furst would add only details and accents on occasion. The debut of this partnership was for Neil Jordan's The Company of Wolves (1984), the charcoal illustrations of the sets caught the attention of Stanley Kubrick and a young Tim Burton. Kubrick hired Furst's company to create convincing Vietnam War settings, without leaving England, for Full Metal Jacket (1987). Burton tried to convince Furst to work on Beetlejuice at this time, but decided to do High Spirits instead, which was being shot in England. In 1990, Jon Peters convinced Furst to sign an exclusive contract with Columbia Pictures, promising him work as a director. Furst's directorial debut was to be MidKnight, a medieval musical fantasy starring Michael Jackson, but after extensive design work and planning the film never materialized. Furst's Columbia contract also prevented him and his employees from working on the Batman Returns (1992). His final credited film was Awakenings (1990).

Death
Furst killed himself on 24 November 1991. He had separated from his wife and begun taking Halcion, a sleeping drug that had been banned in Britain due to its possible side effects of amnesia, paranoia and depression. His drinking also became more of a problem. He was scheduled to check into rehab in 1992. On the night of November 24, 1991, he told his friends he was going to the car to fetch his cigarettes. Instead, he jumped off an eight-storey parking deck.

He was survived by a daughter, Vanessa King; a son, Nicholas Sergei Furst; his mother, Pamela Furst; and a sister, Jane Wearne.

References

External links
 
 

1944 births
Best Art Direction Academy Award winners
Alumni of the Royal College of Art
British Jews
British film designers
Suicides by jumping in California
Artists from London
1991 suicides